The Bahrain Fed Cup team represents Bahrain in Fed Cup tennis competition and are governed by the Bahrain Tennis Federation. They will take part in the Fed Cup for the first time in 2016, competing in the Asia/Oceania Zone Group II.

Players

References

External links
 

Billie Jean King Cup teams
Fed Cup
Fed Cup